Because of technical restrictions, initial spaces, underscores, and colons are removed from the beginning of page titles. You may have meant:
 (character): Space (punctuation)
_ (character): Underscore
: (character): Colon (punctuation)

See also
Character (disambiguation)
Character (symbol)